Donald Lee Beggs was the President of Wichita State University from 1999 until 2012 when he was replaced by John W. Bardo. He was chair of the Kansas Board of Regents Council of University Presidents for the 2002-03 academic year.

At Southern Illinois University at Carbondale, Beggs received his bachelor's and master's degrees. He earned his doctorate in educational measurement and statistics from the University of Iowa in 1966. After completing his Ph.D., he returned to SIUC and joined the Department of Guidance and Educational Psychology. He served in numerous administrative positions during his 32-year tenure at Southern Illinois University, including Dean of the College of Education, Vice President for Academic Affairs, and President, retiring in 1998 as Chancellor of SIU system.

He is the senior author of a nationally standardized test and the author of several books and numerous academic articles. He was selected to serve on the Executive Committee of the National Collegiate Athletic Association and the NCAA Division I Board of Directors beginning in 2001.

External links
 Wichita State University

American statisticians
Educational psychologists
Southern Illinois University alumni
Presidents of Wichita State University
Living people
Year of birth missing (living people)